Britz is a two-part television drama film written and directed by Peter Kosminsky and first screened by Channel 4 in the United Kingdom in October and November 2007.

Britz attempts to understand what would lead a second generation Muslim to turn against the country of their birth. The film makes references to the July 2005 London bombings, and the 2006 Forest Gate raid.

The DVD was released in the UK on 5 November 2007.

Plot
The story concerns two siblings, Sohail and Nasima Wahid, who have been brought up in Bradford, West Yorkshire, a city with a large British Pakistani population. Both are now students, Sohail studying law in London and Nasima studying medicine in Leeds. With new government anti-terrorism legislation being used against Muslims in the UK in the wake of the September 11 attacks in New York, Sohail and Nasima are drawn in radically different directions. Without telling any of his family or friends, Sohail becomes a member of MI5, while continuing his studies, in the belief that he hopes to help to stop terrorists before the situation deteriorates further. In doing so, he learns that some of his neighbours and childhood friends are politically militant. Nasima is trying to integrate into British society, attending medical school and even dates a black British man.  When her family finds out they send her back to Pakistan for a forced arranged marriage.  Her boyfriend follows her, where he is beaten severely and imprisoned by her extended Pakistani family and is only saved by Sohail's intervention. She had already planned to meet the head of a terrorist training camp, and these events lead her to make her decision. She leaves behind her personal belongings and the terrorist group fake her death using a local female. This means she no longer exists and gives her the perfect opportunity not to change her mind and carry out her intentions of a mass suicide bombing.

Part one of the story is told from Sohail's point of view, while part two is from Nasima's point of view. The serial was filmed in London, Bradford, Leeds and Hyderabad, India, not Rawalpindi though part of the story is set there, especially in Part II.

Cast

References

External links
Channel 4 web entry
Interview with the director Peter Kosminsky  - Telegraph
'Britz’ blew its credibility in the final minute - Telegraph
 

2007 films
2007 television films
2007 drama films
Films directed by Peter Kosminsky
British Pakistani films
2000s British films
British drama television films